Mickaël Wolski (born 5 March 1979 in France) is a French retired footballer who last played for Bergerac Périgord in his home country.

Career

Wolski started his senior career with Guegnon in the late 1990s. In 2005, he signed for Stockport County in the English Football League Two, where he made twenty-three appearances and scored two goals. After that, he played for Moulins Yzeure Foot, AC Arles-Avignon, Sporting Club Toulon, and Bergerac Périgord before retiring.

References

External links 
 Football: Wolski aims to be Distin with shout 
 Casper chases French ace 
 Match preview: Stockport v Boston 
 Foot National Profile 
 
 
 corse football! Profile 
 

Association football defenders
French expatriate footballers
1979 births
Kilmarnock F.C. players
Stockport County F.C. players
Bury F.C. players
AC Arlésien players
FC Gueugnon players
Gazélec Ajaccio players
Shamrock Rovers F.C. players
SC Toulon players
French people of Polish descent
French footballers
Living people
Expatriate footballers in Scotland
Bergerac Périgord FC players
Chester City F.C. players
Expatriate association footballers in the Republic of Ireland
Expatriate footballers in England
League of Ireland players